Leesville Airport is a city-owned, public-use general aviation airport located  west of Leesville, a city in Vernon Parish, Louisiana, United States.

Due to the small size of Leesville Airport, it has been assigned the three-letter FAA location identifier of L39, but has no corresponding IATA or ICAO designations.

Leesville Airport is listed as a "Local/Basic" airport in the 2017-2021 National Plan of Integrated Airport Systems Report. Between 2017 and 2021, it was expected to receive $4,914,250 in developmental funding.

Facilities and aircraft 
It has one runway: 18/36 is 3,807 by 75 feet (1,460 x 23 m) with an asphalt surface.

For the 12-month period ending September 22, 2016, the airport had 15,000 aircraft operations, an average of 41 per day: 67% local general aviation (10,000), 20% itinerant general aviation (3,000), and 13% military (2,000). At that time there were 15 aircraft based at this airport: 93% single-engine (14), and 7% helicopter (1).

References

External links 
 
 

Airports in Louisiana
Transportation in Vernon Parish, Louisiana